Ľubomír Dobrík (19 March 1952 – 8 September 2022) was a Slovak judge. Previously a member of the People's Party – Movement for a Democratic Slovakia, he served on the Constitutional Court of Slovakia from 1997 to 2016.

Dobrík died in Bratislava on 8 September 2022, at the age of 70.

References

1952 births
2022 deaths
Slovak judges
Constitutional court judges
People from Zvolen
People's Party – Movement for a Democratic Slovakia politicians
Comenius University alumni
Matej Bel University alumni